Sean Walter Bernard Bouchard (born May 16, 1996) is an American professional baseball first baseman and outfielder for the Colorado Rockies of Major League Baseball (MLB).

Amateur career
A native of San Diego, California, Bouchard attended Cathedral Catholic High School and UCLA. In 2016, he played collegiate summer baseball with the Chatham Anglers of the Cape Cod Baseball League. He was selected by the Colorado Rockies in the 9th round of the 2017 MLB Draft.

Professional career
Bouchard made his professional debut for the Low-A Boise Hawks, posting a .290/.390/.477 slash in his first season. In 2018, Bouchard played in 125 games for the Single-A Asheville Tourists, batting .257/.324/.430 with 14 home runs, 75 RBI, and 22 stolen bases. In 2019, he played for the High-A Lancaster JetHawks, slashing .292/.354/.496 with 13 home runs and 68 RBI in 91 games.

Bouchard did not play in a game in 2020 due to the cancellation of the minor league season because of the COVID-19 pandemic. In 2021, he played in 91 games for the Double-A Hartford Yard Goats, hitting .266/.336/.494 with 14 home runs, 46 RBI, and 8 stolen bases. He was assigned to the Triple-A Albuquerque Isotopes to begin the 2022 season.

Bouchard was called up to the majors for the first time by the Rockies on June 16, 2022. He made his debut on June 19, in which he went 0-3 with a walk. He went hitless in seven at-bats before he suffered a strained left oblique and was placed on the injured list on June 27. On July 16, after a short rehab stint, Bouchard was activated from the injured list and optioned to Triple-A. He finished the season appearing in 27 games for the Rockies, posting a slash of .297/.454/.500 with 3 home runs and 11 RBI.

On March 9, 2023, it was announced that Bouchard had suffered a ruptured left biceps muscle and would require surgery that was likely to be season-ending.

References

External links

Living people
1996 births
Albuquerque Isotopes players
Asheville Tourists players
Baseball players from San Diego
Boise Hawks players
Chatham Anglers players
Colorado Rockies players
Hartford Yard Goats players
Lancaster JetHawks players
Major League Baseball first basemen
Major League Baseball outfielders
UCLA Bruins baseball players